Guillermo Sapiro (born 1966) is an Israeli-Uruguayan computer scientist, electrical engineer and professor who has made notable contributions to image processing. He worked at The University of Minnesota for 15 years before becoming a professor at Duke University. He has also worked at Hewlett Packard Labs (HP Laboratories) researching image processing and is known for being one of the people who originally developed the LOCO-I Compression Algorithm for lossless image compression (that was used in NASA's ICER image file format for various Mars rover expeditions) while he was working there. He has also made significant contributions towards the development of the rotobrush tool in Adobe After Effects, which has been included in After Effects since version CS5. Adobe makes use of his research in various projects like Photoshop and also frequently hires his students. He also teaches a massive open online course through Coursera on image and video processing. The title of the course is "Image and video processing: From Mars to Hollywood with a stop at the hospital." He lives with his wife, two sons, and a golden retriever named Hummus.

References

1966 births
Living people
Technion – Israel Institute of Technology alumni
Israeli computer scientists
Israeli electrical engineers
Uruguayan computer scientists
Duke University faculty
University of Minnesota faculty